Lee Knowlton Blessing (born October 4, 1949) is an American playwright best known for his 1988 work, A Walk in the Woods. A lifelong Midwesterner, Blessing continued to work in regional theaters in and around his hometown of Minneapolis through his 40s before relocating to New York City.

Life and work
Blessing was born in Minneapolis, and graduated from Minnetonka High School in 1967. He began his college education at the University of Minnesota, Minneapolis, but later transferred to Reed College in Oregon where he earned a B.A. in English in 1971. After Blessing earned his degree, his parents offered the young graduate the choice between a used car or a trip to Russia. Blessing chose Russia where he found inspiration to write his best-known work, the award-winning A Walk in the Woods.  According to interviews with Blessing, the play, which depicts the developing relationship between a Russian and an American arms limitation negotiator is based on fact. Apparently, during the 1982 talks in Geneva, Switzerland, Soviet Yuli Kvitsinsky and American Paul Nitze left the formal discussions to literally take a walk in the woods. Following its premiere in Waterford, Connecticut, A Walk in the Woods was nominated for both a Tony award and a Pulitzer Prize. Though the production won neither award, it was reprised produced in Moscow in 1989 and later adapted for television.

Upon returning from his tenure abroad, Blessing went on to study playwriting at the University of Iowa where he received MFA degrees in English and Speech and Theater. He would later return to teach at the Iowa's Playwrights Workshop and the Iowa Writers' Workshop in addition to his time as an instructor at the Playwright's Center in Minneapolis. He currently serves as Head of the graduate playwriting program at Mason Gross School of the Arts at Rutgers University.

Blessing's most recent plays include A Body of Water, Whores, The Scottish Play, Black Sheep, Fortinbras, and many others. He has also written one act plays including The Roads That Lead Here and Eleemosynary. Eight of his plays have been staged at the Eugene O'Neill Theater Center in Waterford, Connecticut during the prestigious National Playwrights Conference. Several of his most recent works produced in New York City including Thief River, Cobb and Chesapeake, received Drama Desk nominations and an award, plus nominations from the Outer Critics Circle.

Blessing married his first wife, Jeanne Blake, in 1986. He is currently married to fellow playwright and screenwriter, Melanie Marnich.

Works

Theatre 

 1975: The Real Billy The Kid
 1980: The Authentic Life of Billy the Kid (revised version premiered Washington, D.C., 1979)
 1983: Nice People Dancing to Good Country Music (premiered Louisville, Kentucky, 1982)
 1985: Independence (premiered Louisville, Kentucky, 1984)
 1986: Riches (as War of the Roses, premiered Louisville, Kentucky, 1985)
 1987: Eleemosynary (premiered St. Paul, Minnesota, 1985; New York, 1989)
 1988: Oldtimers Game (premiered Louisville, Kentucky, 1982)
 1988: A Walk in the Woods (premiered La Jolla, California, 1987; New York and London, 1988)
 1990: Two Rooms (premiered La Jolla, California, 1988)
 1991: Cobb (premiered New Haven, Connecticut, 1989)
 1991: Down the Road (premiered La Jolla, California, 1989)
 1992: Fortinbras (sequel to William Shakespeare's Hamlet)
 1993: Lake Street Extension (premiered New York, 1992)
 1995: Patient A
 1996: Going To St. Ives (premiered in Waterford, CT, 1996)
 1999: Chesapeake (premiered in New York, NY, 1999)
 2000: The Winning Streak (premiered in Waterford, CT, 1999)
 2000: Thief River (premiered in Waterford, CT, 2000)
 2001: Black Sheep (premiered in Manalapan, Florida, 2001)
 2002: The Roads That Lead Here
 2002: Whores (premiered in Waterford, CT, 2002)
 2003: Snapshot (premiered in Louisville, KY, 2002)
 2003: Tyler Poked Taylor (premiered in Louisville, KY, 2002)
 2003: The Road that Leads Here (premiered in Minneapolis, MN, 2002)
 2004: Flag Day (premiered in Shepherdstown, WV, 2004)
 2005: The Scottish Play
 2005: A Body of Water
 2006: Lonesome Hollow
 2007: Moderation
 2008: Great Falls
 2008: Perilous Night
 2009: Into You
 2009: Heaven's My Destination
 2010: When We Go Upon the Sea (premiered in Philadelphia, PA, 2010)
 2013 Courting Harry, (premiered in St. Paul, MN, 2013)
 2015 For the Loyal (premiered in Minneapolis, MN, 2015)

Television 
 1993: Cooperstown

Awards

 American College Theater Festival Award (1979)
 Jerome Foundation Grant (1981, 1982)
 McKnight Foundation Grant (1983, 1989)
 Great American Play Award
 Oldtimers Game (1982)
 Independence (1984)
 War of the Roses (1985)
 Down the Road (1991)
 Snapshot (2002)
 The Roads that Lead Here (2003)
 Great Falls (2008)
 National Endowment for the Arts Grant (1985, 1988)
 Bush Foundation Fellowship (1987)
 American Theater Critics Association Award
 A Walk in the Woods (1987)
 A Body of Water (2006)
 Great Falls (Citation, 2009)
 Marton Award (1988)
 Dramalogue Award (1988)
 Guggenheim Fellowship (1989)
 Humanitas Prize (1993)

References

External links
Lee Blessing - Downstage Center interview at American Theatre Wing.org
 Lee Blessing—entry in The Playwrights Database
 Lee Blessing Papers at the Harry Ransom Center at the University of Texas at Austin

1949 births
Living people
20th-century American dramatists and playwrights
Iowa Writers' Workshop alumni
Writers from Minneapolis
Reed College alumni
Rutgers University faculty
21st-century American dramatists and playwrights
20th-century American male writers
21st-century American male writers
American male dramatists and playwrights